"Give It Up" is a song by American disco and funk band KC and the Sunshine Band, although it was simply credited as KC in many markets, including the United States. Following the backlash against many disco artists on the charts at the beginning of the 1980s, "Give It Up" was a comeback hit for the band in the US. Epic Records refused to release it; however, the independent Meca Records label showed its support and "Give It Up" peaked at number 18 on the US Billboard Hot 100 in March 1984. "Give It Up" had been an even bigger hit in the United Kingdom several months earlier, where it had hit number one on the UK Singles Chart for three weeks in August 1983. It went on to become the 18th best-selling single of the year in the UK. It was the last of the band's hit singles in the US and UK, and the most successful of its ten UK hits. "Give It Up" also peaked at number two in Belgium, number three in Australia, and reached the Top 10 in several other markets.

In 1993, Danish group Cut 'N' Move scored a big hit with their version of "Give It Up", which went to number one in Australia and their native Denmark.

Charts

Weekly charts

Year-end charts

Certifications and sales

Cut 'N' Move version

In 1993, "Give It Up" was covered by Danish Eurodance group Cut 'N' Move, released as the first single from their second album, Peace, Love & Harmony (1993). Their version reached number one in Denmark for five weeks and in Australia for four weeks. The song also peaked at number two in Norway, number five in New Zealand, and number six in Austria, Germany, and Sweden. On the Eurochart Hot 100, it reached number 31 in August 1993. In Australia, it was certified platinum. It is sung by singers Zindy Laursen and Thera Hoeymans. The rap part is performed by MC Zipp (a.k.a. Jens Kjær Larsen). A colorful music video was produced to promote the single. Cut 'N' Move covered the song again in 1997 for Dancemania Covers.

Track listing

Charts

Weekly charts

Year-end charts

Certifications

Release history

Cover versions

In 1998, the song was covered by Québécois singer Jacynthe, both as a solo cover version, one in French, and one as a collaboration with K.C. himself.

The song was covered by Captain Jack on their 2003 album, Party Warriors.

It was covered by the German pop band beFour on their 2008 album, We Stand United.

It was covered by Annie Lennox and Chrissie Hynde during a live performance at the Royal Albert Hall in London on February 9, 1986.

"Love You Long Time" by The Black Eyed Peas, from their 2010 album, The Beginning, contains a sample of "Give It Up".

In popular culture

 The song has been turned into a sporting chant in the United Kingdom, especially at football games in England and Scotland.
For example, after Liverpool F.C. defeated Manchester United F.C. on October 25, 2021, Liverpool's travelling fans mocked under pressure Manchester United manager Ole Gunnar Solskjær by singing "Ole's at the Wheel" to the tune of "Give It Up".
 At an UEFA Europa Conference League match on September 8, 2022, following the death of Queen Elizabeth II, a crowd of Shamrock Rovers F.C. supporters at Tallaght Stadium were heard singing the chant as "Lizzie's in a Box" to mock the death (owing to historic anti-British sentiment in Ireland).
 A version of the song is also sung by the Barmy Army for England batter Alastair Cook, with the words "Ali, Ali Cook" replacing "Baby, Give it up". For the final few overs of day four of Cook's final test match at The Oval (when he had just scored a farewell century), the song was sung continuously by the raucous crowd- led by Cook's friends in a hospitality box.
 The song is heard in Richmond Valentine's lair when Valentine activates the V-Day program in Kingsman: The Secret Service.
 The song is the walk-on music	of professional darts player Vincent van der Voort.
 The song played in the background of a television advertisement for Old Navy during the late 1990s.
 The song was performed by the Filipino band Channels on Eat Bulaga! and Oh No! It's Johnny in 1998.
 The song was chanted by Braehead Clan fans in their appreciation of netminder Kyle Jones.
 The song is chanted by Manchester United supporters in their appreciation of Nicky Butt.
 The song is chanted by Tottenham Hotspur supporters in their appreciation of Rafael van der Vaart.
 The song was featured as the closing theme for Obrolan Artis dalam Berita, an infotainment program on Indonesian television network SCTV from its debut in 2002 until the final episode in early 2005.
 The song was featured in the last series of Play Away performed by Brian Cant, Floella Benjamin and Tony Robinson and arranged by Jonathan Cohen, broadcast on January 7, 1984. It was wiped by the BBC but has now been returned following a YouTube upload.
 At Queen's University, the song is used for the "Clark Hall Pub Dance", an engineering tradition performed at frosh week, sporting events, and other large gatherings.
The song is chanted by Ajax supporters in their appreciation of Donny van de Beek.
The song is played at the beginning of concerts by Scottish singer Gerry Cinnamon.
The song can also be heard playing off and on during the cruise ship scene in the 2011 Adam Sandler film, Jack and Jill.
76ers fans chant this as “Philadelphia, Delphia, Philadelphia...”.

References

1982 singles
1983 singles
1984 singles
1993 singles
KC and the Sunshine Band songs
UK Singles Chart number-one singles
Irish Singles Chart number-one singles
Songs written by Harry Wayne Casey
Eurodance songs
Post-disco songs
1982 songs
Epic Records singles
Number-one singles in Australia
Number-one singles in Denmark